Blumentopf ("Flower pot") were a German hip hop band from Freising, near Munich.

In the early days of the band, the members met irregularly and did not have ambitions to become professional musicians.  Each week a new name was chosen.  The band was invited to perform at a festival for their first live show.  The name at the time was Blumentopf and once it appeared on promotional posters for the festival, it stuck.

They released their first album in 1997 on Four Music.  They have released five more albums as a group, along with songs released on compilations, and various side projects. Until their dissolution in 2016, they were signed to record label EMI.

The band consisted of five members: rappers Cajus Heinzmann (Cajus, Heinemann, Master P), Bernhard Wunderlich (Holunder, Holundermann, Wunder), Florian Schuster (Flo, Kung Schu, Schu), Roger Manglus (Roger, Specht) and Sebastian Weiss (DJ Sepalot).

In October 2015, they announced that they would dissolve the group and played their last concert in Munich on October 22, 2016, thanking all fans for their continuous support throughout the band's 24-year history.

Music
Blumentopf was known for using a Storytelling style.  They used humor, irony, and a lot of wordplay to tell stories about everyday life, relationship, parties, both true and fictitious.

Other songs can be placed in the conscious hip hop genre, commenting on current issues.  The song Danke Bush! ("Thank you, Bush") presents a critical view of the politics of George W. Bush.  Several songs also suggest that drugs and hip hop are not directly connected.  One such song is Nur dass ihr wisst ("Just so you know").  In the lead-up to the 2009 German federal election, the group appeared in a Wahlwerbespot ("election advertisement") in which they encouraged Germans to vote.  They expressed the importance of learning about the candidates and using their right to vote, emphasizing how little effort it really would take.

Blumentopf's first three albums have a very old school hip hop feel.  The fourth album Gern geschehen saw the use of powerful synth beats and unusual musical ideas as seen in Jeder zweite linkt dich, which uses samples from the song Santa Baby for the entire beat.  This was continued in the fifth album Musikmaschine ("Music machine"), which has a song using skateboard noises for the majority of the beat. The band members themselves have learned instruments so they can play their songs. They hoped to develop these opportunities further.

Raportage
The term 'raportage' comes from the music style, rap, and the German word Reportage ("report").  This concept is consistent with Blumentopf's Storytelling style.

For the 2006 FIFA World Cup, Blumentopf worked with the German television channel Das Erste in producing game commentary set to music.  The Raportagen were broadcast with video clips of the band, game and press conference footage, and other related video during Das Erste football coverage.  This concept was continued during UEFA Euro 2008, the 2010 FIFA World Cup, the UEFA Euro 2012 and finally at the 2014 FIFA World Cup, where Germany won the tournament, fulfilling Blumentopf's self-imposed mission in 2006 of continuing the commentaries until Germany became either world or European champion.

Side projects
DJ Sepalot released a solo project entitled Red Handed in 2007.  Roger and Cajus released their solo albums Alles Roger ("Everything roger/ok") and Planet Cajun.  Since the beginning of May 2008, Blumentopf broadcasts a radio show with on3radio.

Awards
Blumentopf was voted Best Live Band by readers of the German hip hop magazine Juice in both 2001 and 2002.

Blumentopf represented Bavaria in the Bundesvision Song Contest 2010, coming in fourth place.

Goethe Institute Middle East Tour
The band was invited to participate in the 2005 Goethe Institute Nah-Ost Tour during the month of November.  The band performed in Tel Aviv, Bethlehem, Beirut, and Amman.  For the tour, the group collaborated with local artists from Egypt, Jordan, Israel, Syria, and Lebanon.

Discography 
Albums
 1995 Demo-CD with Ich bin sexy, An meine Homies etc.
 1997 Kein Zufall (Debut-LP)
 1999 Großes Kino
 2001 Eins A
 2003 Gern geschehen
 2006 Musikmaschine
 2010 WIR
 2012 Nieder mit der gbr
 2013 B-Seiten und Raritäten

Singles
 1996 Abhängen 
 1997 6 Meter 90
 1997 Man kann nicht alles haben
 1999 Fensterplatz
 1999 Was der Handel
 2000 Safari
 2001 Liebe und Hass (Love and Hate)
 2001 R'n'B
 2002 Flirtaholics
 2003 Better Life GmbH feat. Smudo
 2004 Macht Platz
 2004 Alt feat. Texta
 2006 Horst
 2006 Du und ich (You and I)
 2007 Die City schläft (The city is sleeping)
 2010 WIR
 2010 Solala

DVD
 2004: Gern Gesehen – The DVD contains Tour reports, interviews, freestyles and Live records of the Gern Geschehen-Tour.

Collaborations
 1996: Wildwechsel with Fettes Brot
 1998: Alpenpanorama & Zukunftsmusik with Total Chaos
 2000: 2:2
 2000: Session drei & Session vier with Main Concept
 2000: Süßlicher Weihrauch with Brotlose Kunst
 2001: 3 mal täglich with Droopy the Hitmachine
 2002: Bermuda Dreieck with Total Chaos
 2002: Die unendliche Geschichte (The neverending story)
 2002: Kaleidoskop
 2002: Liebe und Hass Teil II with I.L.L. Will
 2002: Niemand with Roey Marquis II.
 2002: Viel Spaß with FlowinImmO & Esther
 2003: Kaliweed with Les Babacools
 2003: Saftig & Sei da
 2004: Egal wo! with Clueso
 2004:  Alt with Texta
 2005: Ich wär so gern… with Nico Suave
 2005: Adam und Ivo with Main Concept
 2005: Weißt du wer? with Toni L and Black Tiger
 2006: Wer spielt mit uns? with Vier zu Eins
 2007: Benghanny Rap with Y Crew (Egypt)

Other collaborations
 2006: Kann man nich lern (Clueso feat. Blumentopf - Juice Exclusive [CD #63])
 2006: Ja Klar! (Juice Exclusive CD #68)
 2006: Gute Musik (Juice Exclusive CD #66 [Juice Edit])
 2006: WM-Raportagen (Das Erste)
 2008: EM-Raportagen (Das Erste)
 2010: WM-Raportagen (Das Erste)

Notes

German hip hop groups
Participants in the Bundesvision Song Contest